"Let Me Live" is a song by English drum and bass band Rudimental and American DJ trio Major Lazer, featuring guest vocals from English singer Anne-Marie and Nigerian singer Mr Eazi. The song was released as a digital download on 15 June 2018, as the third single from Rudimental's third studio album, Toast to Our Differences (2019). The song was written by Thomas Pentz, Philip Meckseper, Jasper Helderman, Kesi Dryden, Piers Aggett, Amir Amor, Leon Rolle, Cesar Ovalle Jr., Bas van Daalen, Oluwatosin Oluwole Ajibade and Anne-Marie.

Background
"We started this song when Mr Eazi came through London and did a session with us," the group told Clash Music. "We ended up changing the key and got Anne-Marie to the studio, which took the song to a whole new level. We then ended up sending it to our friends Major Lazer who flew to London to work with us on it. After that, we heard Ladysmith Black Mambazo were in town and they ended up recording the BVs in the middle eight. Again this track sums up the theme of the album - we have West African, South African, British and American influences on it. It's so much fun to play this one live!"

Charts

Weekly charts

Year-end charts

Certifications

References

2018 singles
2018 songs
Anne-Marie (singer) songs
Major Lazer songs
Rudimental songs
Song recordings produced by Rudimental
Songs written by Amir Amor
Songs written by Anne-Marie (singer)
Songs written by Diplo
Songs written by Jr Blender
Songs written by Will Grands